Acacia aculeiformis is a shrub belonging to the genus Acacia and the subgenus Phyllodineae. It is native to an area in the Mid West and  Wheatbelt regions of Western Australia.

It blooms from August to December and produces yellow-red flowers.

See also
List of Acacia species

References

aculeiformis
Acacias of Western Australia
Plants described in 1999
Taxa named by Bruce Maslin